Dhoomangunjis a locality and is situated near Allahabad, Uttar Pradesh, India.

References 

Neighbourhoods in Allahabad